The Secret of the Old Woods is a 1993 Italian fantastic drama film written, directed and starred by Ermanno Olmi. It is based on the novel with the same name by Dino Buzzati.

For his performance Paolo Villaggio won the Nastro d'Argento for best actor. The film also won the David di Donatello for best cinematography.

Plot 
The general Sebastiano Procolo lives in a little village in the mountains boundless, in a small wooden house near a dense forest, called the "Old Woods". He is there on behalf of his nephew, owner of the reserve; however the general has the ambition to destroy all the trees in order to enrich. One night he discovers that the forest is inhabited by strange invisible creatures that whisper continually being released to resume again in the power of the ancient forest. Sebastiano initially don't understand the situation, but after as in a dream vision he realizes that these creatures have been imprisoned long ago by himself.

Cast 
Paolo Villaggio as Sebastiano Procolo
Giulio Brogi as  Bernardi 
Riccardo Zannantonio as  Benvenuto Procolo
Lino Pais Marden as  Giovanni Aiuti

See also     
 List of Italian films of 1993

References

External links

The Secret of the Old Woods at Variety Distribution

1993 films
Italian fantasy drama films
Films directed by Ermanno Olmi
1990s fantasy drama films
Films based on Italian novels
Films based on works by Dino Buzzati
Films set in the Alps
Films set in forests
1993 drama films
1990s Italian-language films
1990s Italian films